Fairfield Township is the name of some places in the U.S. state of Pennsylvania:
Fairfield Township, Crawford County, Pennsylvania
Fairfield Township, Lycoming County, Pennsylvania
Fairfield Township, Westmoreland County, Pennsylvania

See also 
 East Fairfield Township, Crawford County, Pennsylvania
 Upper Fairfield Township, Lycoming County, Pennsylvania
 Fairfield Township (disambiguation)

Pennsylvania township disambiguation pages